This list is of notable psychiatrists.

Additional lists of psychiatrists can be found at the articles List of figures in psychiatry (though not all individuals at that list are psychiatrists and medical doctors), Fictional psychiatrists, and List of physicians.

Medical doctors who are psychiatrists and included in those lists and are also listed below. Some psychiatrists are also in the list of neurologists and the list of neuroscientists.

See also
Psychiatry
American Board of Psychiatry and Neurology
American Psychiatric Association
Royal College of Psychiatrists
Lists
List of cognitive scientists
List of physicians
List of psychologists
List of fictional psychiatrists

References

Psychology lists
Lists of physicians
Lists of health professionals